Amos C. Cross (February 8, 1860 – July 16, 1888) was an American Major League baseball player from –. His main position was catcher. He played three seasons in the MLB, all for the Louisville Colonels. His brothers, Lave and Frank, also played in the Major Leagues. Amos played in the minor leagues from 1883-1884.

See also
 List of baseball players who died during their careers

References

External links

1860 births
1888 deaths
Louisville Colonels players
Baseball players from Wisconsin
Major League Baseball catchers
19th-century baseball players
Baseball players from Milwaukee
Johnstown (minor league baseball) players
Oil City (minor league baseball) players
19th-century deaths from tuberculosis
Tuberculosis deaths in Ohio